SamKochAvto, originally Samarkand Automobile Factory (Uzbek:Samarqand avto zavodi), is a joint Turkish–Uzbekistani venture with major investment by the Turkish company Koc Holding. Located in Samarkand, Uzbekistan, the plant manufactures buses and has recently launched a production line for Nissan cargo trucks. SamKochAvto produces 4 models of buses and 5 truck models, some of which are exported. Plans have been announced for production of Suzukis.

Activity

"Samarkand automobile plant" for the production of medium-capacity buses and small trucks and medium-duty trucks, organized in 1996 by the decision of the Government of the Republic of Uzbekistan for the number 381 from 5 November 1996, the commencement of commercial operations from 19 March 1999.

Products

The SamAuto lineup includes basic models in the small class SAZ NP 37 chassis Japanese Isuzu, low-floor bus of small class SAZ LE-60, ISUZU trucks and other special vehicles on the chassis of Isuzu.

References
SamKochAvto production and exports, Press-service of the President of the Republic of Uzbekistan, 20 May 2002.
SamKochAvto commences production of Ford cargo trucks, December 2003.
SamKochAvto to launch Land Rover, newnations.com, 27 February 2003.

External links
 Official site

Bus manufacturers of Uzbekistan
Truck manufacturers of Uzbekistan
Samarkand